Walter Charles Key known as Nobby Key (1906–1941) was an international speedway rider from England.

Speedway career 
Key earned the nickname 'Nobby' and came to prominence in 1929 when signing for the Wembley Lions. During the 1931 season, when riding for Nottingham (speedway) he was seeking a transfer following continued machinery problems and as one of their star riders was also one of the highest wage earners, something the club were addressing. He did leave and joined the Crystal Palace Glaziers where he became their club captain and earned several England caps. When the Crystal Palace operation moved in 1934 he was attached to the New Cross Lambs.

War and death
He joined the Merchant navy at the outbreak of World War II. However, he is listed as being killed as a civilian casualty on 20 April 1941 at Sheringham Avenue (presumably in a bombing) based on the fact that he is listed as a civilian casualty and that it is known that Sheringham Avenue was subject to German bombs in late April 1941.

Players cigarette cards
Key is listed as number 22 of 50 in the 1930s Player's cigarette card collection.

References 

1906 births
1941 deaths
British speedway riders
Wembley Lions riders
New Cross Rangers riders
Wimbledon Dons riders
British Merchant Navy personnel of World War II
British civilians killed in World War II
Deaths by airstrike during World War II